Glacial erratic boulders of Estonia are large boulders of rock which have been formed and moved into Estonia by glacial action during previous ice ages.  Before the Soviet occupation of Estonia, these large boulders were a symbol of national identity.  They are now registered and protected by the Estonian government.

Glacial erratic boulders are found in especially large quantities in Estonia. Some particular large ones have been found in the sea, including some near Osmussaar that are  diameter. The Osmussaar boulders are believed to have been pushed there by glaciers from the Neugrund meteorite crater.

The Estonian boulders were important in the development of the idea that northern Europe was once covered in glaciers.  The first to suggest that the boulders were moved by glaciers was Russian mineralogist Vasily Severgin who was led to this conclusion by their similarity to Finnish basement rock at the very early date of 1815.  However, Severgin was later to retract this theory in favour of the drift theory of Charles Lyell who believed they had been carried by icebergs.  However, in the following years of the 19th century the glaciation theory slowly gained the ascendancy.

List of boulders

References

Geology of Estonia
 
Glacial erratic boulders